The Fuji Xerox J-Stars are an American football team located in Itami, Hyogo, Japan.  They are a member of the X-League.

Team history
1985 Team founded by members of the Fuji Xerox Osaka group.
1989 Joined the X-League.
2010 Promoted from X2 to X1 for the following season.
2011 Finished 6th in the West Division (0 wins, 7 losses). Lost X2-X1 replacement game to the Hankyu Bruins 5-25. Demoted from X1 to X2 for the following season.
2015 Due to the Nishinomiya Bruins finishing 0-2 in the Green Bowl Spring tournament, the J-Stars were promoted to X1 for the Fall tournament. Finished 6th in the West division (0 wins, 7 losses). Lost X2-X1 replacement game to the Sidewinders 10-17. Demoted to X2 for the following season.

Seasons

References

External links 
  (Japanese)

American football in Japan
Fuji Xerox
1985 establishments in Japan
American football teams established in 1985